Boston is a hamlet in the town of Boston in Erie County, New York, United States.

References

Hamlets in New York (state)
Hamlets in Erie County, New York